The 2nd Sangley Rebellion was the uprising of rural Sangley (Chinese Filipinos) in Manila against the Captaincy General of the Philippines in 1639. It resulted in the massacre of around 17,000-22,000 Chinese.

Background
After the first Sangley Rebellion in 1603, conditions for the Chinese in Manila returned to some degree of normalcy for a time. However as the Chinese population continued to prosper, they incurred heavier restrictions from the Spanish. Although they were exempt from labour and petty personal dues required of the Filipinos, the Chinese had to pay a license fee of 8 pesos per year with additional extortion and harassment from sellers. They were also subject to population control in addition to the license fee, with an idealized limit of 6,000, but in reality the Chinese population in 1620s and 1630s ranged from 15,000 to 21,000. The Chinese petitioned the king of Spain for self-government but this was rejected in 1630. As the Chinese population continued to swell, reaching 33,000-45,000 by 1639, they entered other industries such as farming. They were laborers on their own in outlying areas, employed on estates of religious orders, or used as farm labor in forced settlement projects. This large rural Chinese population rebelled again in 1639, resulting in another massacre.

Rebellion
The rebellion of 1639 occurred in rural Luzon where most of the rebels came from. It started at Calamba, where several thousand Chinese had been coerced to settle and forced to pay substantial rent to the Spanish. It was a very unhealthy place and about 300 of them had already died by the time of the rebellion on 20 November. The rebels advanced towards Manila and by 22 November, had taken the church at San Pedro Makati on the eastern outskirts of the city. The Chinese town was only briefly occupied by them. Although well-organized, the rebellion was poorly armed and could not stand up to the Spanish and Filipino forces, which routed them upon their arrival. However uprisings were reported in other areas as well and from 26 November to 2 December, the Chinese controlled the north bank of the Pasig River.

On 2 December, the Chinese settlement revolted and started fires. The Spanish began firing on the Chinese from the city walls. On 5 December, the Spanish ordered the execution of any Chinese that could be found, with a reward for each Chinese head. The Chinese were systematically rounded up and killed ten at a time. In total some 17,000 to 22,000 Chinese were slaughtered. Some Chinese fled to the mountains but were eventually dislodged. Around 6,000-7,000 Chinese rebels held out on the eastern shore of Laguna de Bay until 15 March 1640, when they were surrounded and forced to surrender.

References

Bibliography

17th-century rebellions
Chinese diaspora in the Philippines
History of Manila
History of the Philippines (1565–1898)
Rebellions in the Philippines